Georg Kössler (born 21 December 1984) is a German politician currently serving as Member of the Abgeordnetenhaus of Berlin since the 2016 election as a statewide member representing Alliance 90/The Greens.

Personal life and education
Tomiak was born in Berlin and grew up in Köpenick. He completed his secondary education at the Alexander-von-Humboldt-Gymnasium. He then studied political science at University of Erlangen-Nuremberg and completed his diploma at the Free University of Berlin. From 2011-2012 he was a Research Fellow at the Heinrich Böll Foundation.

Career
At the 2016 election Kössler contested the Neukölln 3 constituency for The Greens and received 21.7% of the vote but was defeated by Joschka Langenbrinck of the SPD. He was, however, elected as a statewide list member.

Kössler is especially involved in climate and environmental activism and is a keen cyclist. He serves as the Green group spokesperson for Climate and Environmental Protection and Club Culture.

Kössler is the Spokesperson for the Greens Federal Energy Working Group, a role he has served in since 2012.

References

Living people
1984 births
Alliance 90/The Greens politicians
German environmentalists
Members of the Abgeordnetenhaus of Berlin
People from Treptow-Köpenick